Oldham County is the name of two counties in the United States:

Oldham County, Kentucky 
Oldham County, Texas